The 2001 UEFA European Under-16 Championship was the 19th edition of UEFA's European Under-16 Football Championship. It was the last under-16 championship, before changing the name as under-17 championships. England hosted the championship, during 22 April – 6 May. 16 teams entered the competition, and Spain defeated France in the final to win the competition for the sixth time.

Match officials

Squads

Qualifying

Group stage

Group A

Group B

Group C

Group D

Knockout stage

Quarter-finals

Semi-finals

Third place play-off

Final

Statistics

Goalscorers

7 goals
 Fernando Torres

6 goals
 Florent Sinama Pongolle

5 goals
 Anthony Le Tallec

3 goals

 Erdal Kılıçaslan
 Piotr Trochowski
 József Kanta
 Francesco Lodi
 Giampaolo Pazzini

2 goals

 Wouter Vandendriessche
 Ivan Grivičić
 Niko Kranjčar
 Glen Johnson
 Sébastien Grax
 Mourad Meghni
 Youssef Sofiane
 Ralf de Haan
 Jaime Gavilán
 Cédric Tsimba

1 goal

 Maxence Coveliers
 Kristof Goessens
 Hrvoje Čale
 Mario Grgurović
 Drago Papa
 Dejan Prijić
 Igor Ružak
 Eddie Johnson
 Cherno Samba
 Steven Schumacher
 John Welsh
 Tommi Peltonen
 Baldo di Gregorio
 Alexander Laas
 Oliver Madejski
 Patrick Ochs
 David Odonkor
 Christian Petereit
 Mihály Horváth
 Zsolt Müller
 Mauro Belotti
 Paolo Facchinetti
 Marek Wasicki
 Rareş Tudor Oprea
 Gabriel Velcovici
 Anatoli Gerk
 Craig Beattie
 Paul McLaughlin
 Graham Weir
 Guillem Bauzà
 Melli
 Miguel Flaño
 Senel
 Joël Gasche
 Dündar Denizhan
 Sabri
 Sezgin Yilmaz

References

External links
2001 UEFA European Under-16 Championship at Union of European Football Associations
2001 UEFA European Under-16 Championship at Rec.Sport.Soccer Statistics Foundation

UEFA
UEFA European Under-17 Championship
International association football competitions hosted by England
UEFA European Under-16 Championship
April 2001 sports events in Europe
2001 in youth association football